Those Were the Days! is a 1940 comedy film directed by Theodore Reed and starring William Holden and Bonita Granville.

Plot
On their 35th wedding anniversary, Petey and Martha Simmons remember how they met in college.

Petey Simmons is a wealthy newcomer at college, so rival fraternities fight over him. His ego swells as fraternity boys and pretty girls bid for his time. At a school dance, Petey's shy roommate invited campus beauty Mirabel Allstairs to be his date. Petey ignores his own date, Martha Scroggs, dancing with other girls instead.

Petey, who had previously been arrested, pulls pranks on campus, such as changing a professor's clocks to delay an exam. A later act of vandalism leads to another arrest. The judge threatens to throw the book at him, sentencing him to six months in jail. Petey asks for a week's continuance before sentencing, then uses the time to court Martha when he discovers that she is the judge's daughter. When his scheme is revealed, Petey is locked in the town jail by the angry judge. However, Martha is smitten with him and is intentionally arrested so that she can occupy the cell next to Petey's, holding hands with him between the bars.

With the flashback completed and in the present day, the old judge still cannot believe how his daughter and son-in-law came together. They also hear that Petey Jr. has just been arrested, but the judge is not surprised.

Cast
Those Were the Days! is Barrett's final film; she retired from after completing work on the film.

References

External links
 Those Were the Days! at IMDb
 

1940 films
1940 romantic comedy films
American romantic comedy films
American black-and-white films
1940s American films